NGC 4365 is an elliptical galaxy located in the constellation Virgo. It was discovered by William Herschel on April 13, 1784.

NGC 4365 is the central galaxy of W' cloud, a cloud of galaxies about 6 megaparsecs behind (further from us than) the Virgo supercluster.
NGC 4365 has a kinematically distinct, counter-rotating stellar core region, which provides strong evidence for the theory that elliptical galaxies grow through mergers. The mean age of its stellar population is greater than 12 billion years, and it retains a triaxial structure that has remained largely unchanged for 12 billion years.

There is a stream of globular clusters connecting NGC 4365 to the neighboring compact S0 galaxy NGC 4342. It appears that NGC 4365 is stripping globular clusters and stars from its neighbor via tidal interaction.

References

External links 
 

Virgo (constellation)
Elliptical galaxies
4365
Astronomical objects discovered in 1784
040375